Bakh is a city in Garizat District of Taft County, Yazd province, Iran. At the 2006 National Census, its population was 779 in 215 households, when it was a village in Garizat Rural District of Nir District. The following census in 2011 counted 1,067 people in 310 households, by which time it was in the newly formed Garizat District. The latest census in 2016 showed a population of 718 people in 224 households; it was the largest village in its rural district. It was raised to the status of a city after the 2016 census.

References 

Taft County

Populated places in Yazd Province

Populated places in Taft County